Cronman or sometimes von Cronman

Fritz Cronman (-?), Swedish diplomat to Russia
Hans Detterman Cronman (-?), Swedish lord of Alatskivi and war commissar who married Ursula Kordes (1600–1675)
Joachim Cronman ( – 1703), Swedish commandant of Neumünde
Johan Cronman (1662–1737) Swedish governor of Malmö from 1727 to 1737, and commandant of Skåne
Cronman (2017–2019) Turkish cronmaster in Madrid known for liking the Azzaro cologne